Harry Zvi Tabor (March 7, 1917 – December 15, 2015) was an Israeli physicist. He is known as the father of Israeli solar energy.  He is generally credited with having brought Israel's solar energy program to international prominence.

Biography
Harry Zvi Tabor was born at London in 1917 to Charles and Rebecca Tabor. As a youth, he was involved in the UK branch of Habonim Dror, and participated in an 80th anniversary reunion in 2009.  In 1947 he married Vivenne Landau.  He received his bachelor's degree in physics from the University of London and Hebrew University.  He died in Jerusalem on December 15, 2015, at the age of 98.

Scientific career
In 1949 prime minister David Ben-Gurion sent a letter to England to offer Tabor a job on the 'physics and engineering desk' of the Research Council of Israel, which he accepted.  His first task was to create the National Physical Laboratory of Israel, which had been Tabor's idea as he felt it was essential the new country have the equivalent of the National Physical Laboratory in Britain to create standards amongst the different measurements in use in the country, primarily British, Ottoman and metric.   Once the laboratory was established, he focused on solar energy for research and development.

He was instrumental in developing the solar water heater that 95 percent of Israeli households have.  In 1992 he was awarded an honorary degree from the Weizmann Institute of Science.  These simple water heaters operated without pumps, whereby cold water was heated in the panel, which acted as a thermosiphon. This unit in turn became the standard for solar water heating worldwide, and helped popularize the commercialization of solar thermal technology in the United States in the 1970s, where Tabor lectured and acted as a consultant to solar start-up companies such as Northrup, Inc. which subsequently merged into ARCO Solar, which became BP Solar.  Tabor experimented with various coatings to optimize the absorptivity of solar energy, with minimizing the re-radiation, or emissivity of the heat absorbed. This led to his development of a "black chrome" surface for the copper water-bearing plate.

Tabor worked with the Standards Institute of Israel, to establish testing procedures and an official performance certificates  so that a solar collector could not be bought without SII certification.

Tabor and French immigrant Lucien Bronicki developed a small solar power unit, an Organic Rankine cycle turbine, for developing countries with problematic power grids.  It was designed to neutralize the maintenance issues of reciprocating engines so it had only one moving part, the rotor.  A 3 kWe prototype was exhibited at the 1961 United Nations Conference on New Sources of Energy in Rome, but it failed to find commercial success.

Awards and recognition 
 1975 – Royal Society Energy Award
 1979 – Inducted in Solar Hall of Fame
 1981 – International Solar Energy Society Award
 1981 – Krupp Foundation Energy Award
 1994 – Passive Low Energy Architecture International Award
 1995 – Israeli Knesset Quality of Life Award
 2014 – Israeli President's Medal of Distinction

See also 
 David Faiman

Original materials are archived at the Weizmann Institute of Science, Rehovot, Israel.

References 

Solar power in Israel
1917 births
2015 deaths
British emigrants to Israel
British Jews
Israeli engineers
Israeli Jews
Israeli physicists
Alumni of the University of London
Hebrew University of Jerusalem alumni
Recipients of the Presidential Medal of Distinction of Israel
Jewish physicists